Nobuo Kubota  D.F.A. (born 1932) is a Canadian multimedia artist.

Life
Kubota grew up with a strong Japanese focus in his home and with an early interest in the writings by Jack Kerouac and D. T. Suzuki. These two factors partially explain his later attraction to Zen Buddhism. He has a degree in architecture from the University of Toronto and practiced architecture for ten years. As an architect, his interest in Zen Buddhism was reinforced by an attraction to Japanese architecture, which was to have an influence on him later as a sculptor. He became a sculptor in 1969, showed regularly with the Isaacs Gallery group in Toronto, and is said to have deliberately adopted a Japanese 'look' in his work whereby he alludes to Japanese aesthetics and art.

When Nobuo Kubota was awarded a Canada Council grant in 1970 he was able to spend a year in Japan. He went ostensibly to study Japanese art but found his way to Kyoto where he was invited to live with a Zen master, Nanrei Sohatsu Kobori, in his temple in the famous Daitokuji complex.

Work
His work often combines sound, music, installation and film, a practice that he labels 'intermedia'. A member of the Artists Jazz Band from the late 1960s on (he played alto sax) and the CCMC (Canadian Creative Music Collective) (1974-1991), and as one of the founding members of the Music Gallery, he is known for his extended vocal techniques and sound poetry which can be watched and listened to on You Tube. In 1999, the Kelowna At Gallery held a retrospective of his work titled Nobuo Kubota: The Exploration of Possibility. A second exhibition titled Nobuo Kubota: Hokusai Revisited was held at Kelowna in 2010. His current interest involves the development of a calligraphic style of notation for the depiction of sound which he calls 'Sonic Calligraphy'. He has published two books, Phonic Slices  and Deep Text (both 2001) with Coach House Books.

His work is held in numerous collections including the National Gallery of Canada. He was made a member of the Royal Canadian Academy of Arts.

He received the Allied Arts Award from the Royal Architectural Institute of Canada. 
In 2000, he received the Victor Lynch Stanton Award from the Canada Council. He received the Governor General's award for the arts in 2009. He also received a Doctor of Fine Arts Honoris Causa from the Ontario College of Art and Design (2011).

From 1970 to 1998, he taught at OCAD University.

Notes

1932 births
Living people
Artists from Vancouver
Canadian photographers
Canadian contemporary artists
Canadian multimedia artists
Canadian sculptors
Canadian people of Japanese descent
Governor General's Award in Visual and Media Arts winners
Members of the Royal Canadian Academy of Arts
Academic staff of OCAD University
Canadian abstract artists